Louis David Sleeth (26 February 1916 – 29 November 1990) was an Australian rules footballer who played with Richmond in the Victorian Football League (VFL).

Notes

External links 

1916 births
1990 deaths
Australian rules footballers from Victoria (Australia)
Richmond Football Club players
Box Hill Football Club players